Samoryadovo is a rural locality in Polyansky Selsoviet Rural Settlement, Kursky District, Kursk Oblast, Russia. Population:

Geography 
The village is located west from the Bolshaya Kuritsa River (a right tributary of the Seym River), 80 km from the Russia–Ukraine border, 16 km west of Kursk, 3 km from the selsoviet center – Polyanskoye.

 Climate
Samoryadovo has a warm-summer humid continental climate (Dfb in the Köppen climate classification).

Transport 
Samoryadovo is located 9 km from the federal route  Crimea Highway (a part of the European route ), 2 km from the road of intermunicipal significance  (M2 "Crimea Highway" – Polyanskoye – border of the Oktyabrsky District), 2.5 km from the road  (38N-197 – Pimenovo), on the road  (38N-199 – Samoryadovo), 10 km from the nearest railway station Dyakonovo (railway line Lgov I — Kursk).

The rural locality is situated 23 km from Kursk Vostochny Airport, 128 km from Belgorod International Airport and 226 km from Voronezh Peter the Great Airport.

References

Notes

Sources

Rural localities in Kursky District, Kursk Oblast